Gonatium is a genus of  dwarf spiders that was first described by Anton Menge in 1868.

Species
 it contains nineteen species, found in Algeria, Bulgaria, Canada, China, France, Israel, Italy, Japan, Kazakhstan, Kenya, Korea, Macedonia, Morocco, Portugal, Romania, Russia, Spain, Turkey, and the United States:
Gonatium arimaense Oi, 1960 – Korea, Japan
Gonatium biimpressum Simon, 1884 – France (Corsica), Italy
Gonatium cappadocium Millidge, 1981 – Turkey
Gonatium crassipalpum Bryant, 1933 – USA, Canada
Gonatium dayense Simon, 1884 – Algeria
Gonatium ensipotens (Simon, 1881) – Portugal, Spain, France, Italy
Gonatium geniculosum Simon, 1918 – France
Gonatium hilare (Thorell, 1875) – Central and southern Europe, Azerbaijan?
Gonatium japonicum Simon, 1906 – Russia (Far East), China, Korea, Japan
Gonatium nemorivagum (O. Pickard-Cambridge, 1875) – Southern Europe
Gonatium nipponicum Millidge, 1981 – Russia (Far East), Japan
Gonatium occidentale Simon, 1918 – Spain, France, Morocco, Algeria, Israel
Gonatium orientale Fage, 1931 – Romania, Bulgaria
Gonatium pacificum Eskov, 1989 – Russia (Middle Siberia to Far East)
Gonatium paradoxum (L. Koch, 1869) – Europe
Gonatium petrunkewitschi Caporiacco, 1949 – Kenya
Gonatium rubellum (Blackwall, 1841) – Europe, Russia (Europe to Far East)
Gonatium rubens (Blackwall, 1833) (type) – Europe, Caucasus, Russia (Europe to Far East), Kazakhstan, Central Asia, Japan
Gonatium strugaense Drensky, 1929 – Macedonia

See also
 List of Linyphiidae species (A–H)

References

Araneomorphae genera
Cosmopolitan spiders
Linyphiidae